Aquitania (minor planet designation: 387 Aquitainia), provisional designation , is a Postremian asteroid from the central regions of the asteroid belt, approximately 101 kilometers in diameter. Discovered by Fernand Courty at the Bordeaux Observatory in 1894, it was named for the French region of Aquitaine, the former province of Gallia Aquitania in the ancient Roman Empire.

Discovery 

Aquitania was discovered by French astronomer Fernand Courty at the Bordeaux Observatory on 5 March 1894. It was second of his two asteroid discoveries. The first was 384 Burdigala.

Classification and orbit 

Aquitania is the largest member of the Postrema family, a mid-sized central asteroid family of little more than 100 members. It orbits the Sun in the central main-belt at a distance of 2.1–3.4 AU once every 4 years and 6 months (1,657 days). Its orbit has an eccentricity of 0.24 and an inclination of 18° with respect to the ecliptic.

Physical characteristics 

In the Tholen and SMASS classification, Aquitania is an S-type and L-type asteroid, respectively. Several rotational lightcurves of Aquitania have been obtained from photometric observations since the 1980s. Lightcurve analysis gave a consolidated rotation period of 24.144 hours with a brightness variation between 0.09 and 0.25 magnitude.

According to the surveys carried out by the Infrared Astronomical Satellite IRAS, the Japanese Akari satellite and the NEOWISE mission of NASA's Wide-field Infrared Survey Explorer, Aquitania measures between 97.33 and 105.06 kilometers in diameter  and its surface has an albedo between 0.174 and 0.203.

The Collaborative Asteroid Lightcurve Link adopts the results obtained by IRAS, that is an albedo of 0.19 and a diameter of 100.51 kilometers based on an absolute magnitude of 7.44.

Naming 

This minor planet was named for the Latin name of the French region of Aquitaine. Under Caesar the Roman region of Gallia Aquitania consisted of the country between the Pyrenees mountains and Garonne river. The region was later expanded to the Loire and Allier rivers under Augustus. The official naming citation was mentioned in The Names of the Minor Planets by Paul Herget in 1955.

References

External links 
 Asteroid Lightcurve Database (LCDB), query form (info )
 Dictionary of Minor Planet Names, Google books
 Asteroids and comets rotation curves, CdR – Observatoire de Genève, Raoul Behrend
 Discovery Circumstances: Numbered Minor Planets (1)-(5000) – Minor Planet Center
 
 

000387
Discoveries by Fernand Courty
Named minor planets
000387
000387
18940305